The Brinks House at 416 Railroad Street in Alberton in Mineral County, Montana was built in 1912. It was listed on the National Register of Historic Places in 1997.

It is one of few surviving vernacular gable-front houses which were common during Alberton's early development period from 1908 to 1917.

The parcel was at one point owned by John McCarthy, a real estate agent, but the first owners of the house were E.P. and Ella Brinks. E.P. Brinks was a telegraph operator for the Milwaukee Road. Brinks happened to provide Alberton with its primary water supply, because he separately bought a water system of the Milwaukee Land Company and private springs and combined them, then sold the system to the town.

References

Houses on the National Register of Historic Places in Montana
Houses completed in 1912
National Register of Historic Places in Mineral County, Montana
1912 establishments in Montana